Karel is an educational programming language for beginners, created by Richard E. Pattis in his book Karel The Robot: A Gentle Introduction to the Art of Programming. Pattis used the language in his courses at Stanford University, California. The language is named after Karel Čapek, a Czech writer who introduced the word robot in his play R.U.R.

Principles
A program in Karel is used to control a simple robot named Karel that lives in an environment consisting of a grid of streets (left-right) and avenues (up-down). Karel understands five basic instructions: move (Karel moves by one square in the direction he is facing), turnLeft (Karel turns 90 ° left), putBeeper (Karel puts a beeper on the square he is standing at), pickBeeper (Karel lifts a beeper off the square he is standing at), and turnoff (Karel switches himself off, the program ends). Karel can also perform boolean queries about his immediate environment, asking whether there is a beeper where he is standing, whether there are barriers next to him, and about the direction he is facing.  A programmer can create additional instructions by defining them in terms of the five basic instructions, and by using conditional control flow statements if and while with environment queries, and by using the iterate construct.

Example
The following is a simple example of Karel syntax:
 BEGINNING-OF-PROGRAM
  
  DEFINE turnRight AS
  BEGIN
    turnLeft;
    turnLeft;
    turnLeft;
  END
  
  BEGINNING-OF-EXECUTION
    ITERATE 3 TIMES
    BEGIN
      turnRight;
      move
    END
    turnoff
  END-OF-EXECUTION
  
 END-OF-PROGRAM

Variants and descendants
The language has inspired the development of various clones and similar educational languages. As the language is intended for beginners, localized variants exist in some languages, notably Czech (the programming language was quite popular in Czechoslovakia).

The principles of Karel were updated to the object-oriented programming paradigm in a new programming language called Karel++. Karel++ is conceptually based on Karel, but uses a completely new syntax, similar to Java.

A REALbasic implementation, rbKarel, provides the basic Karel commands within an RBScript environment with BASIC syntax being used for loops and conditionals. This teaching project provides a cross-platform GUI for Karel experiments including single-stepping and spoken output.

A Karel-inspired language and environment called  Robot Emil uses a 3D view of the robot's world. Robot Emil offers a large palette of objects that can be placed to depict walls, windows (transparency), water and grass. The camera may be moved freely throughout the 3D environment. The robot may be controlled interactively with buttons in the GUI, or by programs written in Emil's Karel-like programming language. The author states that the program is free for use by schools, students and children. Versions are available in English, Czech and Slovak.

A proprietary language which is also called Karel is used to program the robots of FANUC Robotics.  However, FANUC Karel is derived from Pascal.

The language has also been implemented as Karel the Dog in JavaScript by CodeHS. Similar to the original language, this implementation features Karel in a grid world. Programmers use and build upon Karel's simple vocabulary of commands to accomplish programming tasks. Instead of putting and picking beepers, Karel the Dog puts and takes tennis balls.

A German version of Karel is named "Robot Karol".

See also 
 Educational programming language
 RoboMind - An attractive, educational alternative programming environment
 RUR-PLE - another "learn Python" tool based on ideas in Karel
 CodeHS - introductory computer science education using Karel in JavaScript

Further reading 
 Richard E. Pattis. Karel The Robot: A Gentle Introduction to the Art of Programming. John Wiley & Sons, 1981. .
 Joseph Bergin, Mark Stehlik, Jim Roberts, Richard E. Pattis. Karel++: A Gentle Introduction to the Art of Object-Oriented Programming. John Wiley & Sons, 1996. .

References

External links
 Karel syntax
 xKarel by R. Dostal and P. Abrahamczik (created 1997)
 Karel by T. Mitchell (created 2000)
 Karel in tiny-c by Lee Bradley (created 2013)
 Karel for iPad by CloudMakers (created 2014)
 Karel in JavaScript by CodeHS
 Karel in Perl 5 by E. Choroba (created 2016)
 Karel-3D in JavaScript and C++ (sk) (en) (de) (es) (created 2017, 2018)
 Guido van Robot (GvR) - Karel in Python (created 2006, 2010)

Educational programming languages
Procedural programming languages
Programming languages created in 1981